The 4th Parliament of Antigua and Barbuda was elected on Monday, 29 November 1965, and was dissolved on Saturday, 5 December 1970.

On February 27, 1967, the parliament transferred from a unicameral Legislative Assembly into a bicameral Parliament.

Members

Senate 
Unknown

House of Representatives/Legislative Assembly 
Speaker: Hon. Denfield W. Hurst

References 

Parliaments of Antigua and Barbuda